Tom N Toms Coffee (탐앤탐스) is a coffeehouse chain based in South Korea. It first opened in the Apgujeong-dong District of Seoul and now has over 400 branches in 9 different countries worldwide. It is also among the top 3 coffee brands in South Korea.

History 
 In 2001 Founded Tom N Toms
 In 2005, Released Pretzel and Honey butter bread 
 In 2009, 100th shop in Korea and1st shop in Australia opens
In 2016, Launched on-demand delivery in partnership with RushOrder; LA served as the first test market

Menu

Coffee 
Americano and Latte is in the main menu.

Tea 
Black, Herb, Fresh Tea

Smoothie 
Yogurt and Non yogurt smoothie

Pretzel 
Pretzel is one of famous menu of Tom N Toms

Bread 
Honey butter Bread, Garlic bread

International Expansion
In 2009, the South Korean coffee chain established its first franchises abroad- opening two stores in Australia and one in Singapore. From then on, the company have established branches and franchises across the world, including in the United States, Thailand, Philippines, Macau, China, Mongolia, Malaysia and Hong Kong. The South China Morning Post estimated that the company had 200 international stores. However, this is not stated on the company's official website- which references only 70 global stores on their 'Global List'.

The first store to be located in Macau was opened in September 2015.

In February 2015, Tom N Toms opened its first branch in the Philippines, located in Bacolod City.

As of  February 2016, there are 6 to 7 retail stores opened and operating in the Los Angeles, CA (Korea town) not including 1 store in the Little Tokyo and few additional stores in other parts of the United States.

On June 23, 2016, Tom N Toms and RushOrder, a mobile-first food ordering technology company, jointly announced the launch of their partnership to offer on-demand delivery and mobile ordering in the US, with Los Angeles being their first test market.

In June 2016, Tom N Tom's opened their first branch in Hong Kong, located in Sha Tin. In September 2016, Tom N Toms opened its second branch in Philippines at The Greenery in Mabolo, Cebu City. Now (December 2016), there are stores across Hong Kong, including Kwun Tong and The ONE, Tsim Sha Tsui.

References

External links
 

Coffee brands
South Korean brands
Coffeehouses and cafés in South Korea